The University of Kaposvár is a university in Hungary. It was established in 2000. It offers undergraduate and postgraduate education. The Health Sciences Center and the Feed Crops Research Institute in Iregszemcse are parts of the University.

Faculties
Its four faculties are:
 Faculty of Animal Science
 Faculty of Economic Sciences
 Faculty of Pedagogy
 Faculty of Arts

External links
 Official site of the University
 History of the University

Buildings and structures in Kaposvár
Universities and colleges in Hungary
Educational institutions established in 2000
Buildings and structures in Somogy County
Education in Somogy County
2000 establishments in Hungary